Diaphus basileusi is a species of lanternfish found in the Western Indian Ocean.

Size

Etymology
The fish is named in honor of Basil Nafpaktitis (1929–2015), because of his investigations of myctophid systematics, especially of the genus Diaphus.

References

Myctophidae
Taxa named by Vladimir Eduardovich Becker
Taxa named by Victor Gavrilovich Prut'ko
Fish described in 1984